Pangshura is a genus of geoemydid turtles endemic to South Asia. Its member species were formerly in the obsolete genus Kachuga. A fifth member, Pangshura tatrotia, was described in 2010, but it is only known from Pliocene fossils.
2 to 4 black blotches on each shield, which form a symmetrical pattern but one of each gular, anal, axillary and inguinal shields. Carapace olive green with small black spots, an orange or red band present on first three vertebral shields (Smith, 1931: Sharma, 1998).

Habits and habitats: The species inhabits

freshwater bodies with plenty of aquatic vegetation. Though entirely aquatic, the turtle is a poor swimmer. Usually few individuals are seen basking on logs on the standing water. Herbivorous, feeds chiefly on aquatic vegetation. The turtle has a peculiar defensive habit of retracting the head and forelimbs, everting the hindlimbs and pushing the shell forward till suitable shelter is reached. (Sharma, 1998: Das, 2002). Not much is known about the breeding habits but found to lay 9 fully developed eggs, each measuring about 1.2 cm (Ahmed, 1958).

Distribution: Bangladesh, India, Pakistan (Ganges

and Brahmaputra River System in India and Sind

River in Pakistan), and Nepal (Das, 2002).

Economic importance: A popular pet animal. Shell

is used for ornamental purposes.

Status: Common and widely distributed in Bangladesh but the population becoming low because of habitat loss, over harvesting for trade, and use as pet. Included in CITES Appendix 1.

Species
The described species are:
 Pangshura smithii - brown roofed turtle
 Pangshura sylhetensis - Assam roofed turtle
 Pangshura tecta - Indian roofed turtle
 Pangshura tentoria - Indian tent turtle
 †Pangshura tatrotia (fossil)

References

External links
Photos at Chelonia.org

 
Turtle genera
Taxa named by John Edward Gray